Hungarian Nights or Night Is Whispering (German: Es flüstert die Nacht) is a 1929 German silent drama film directed by Victor Janson and starring Lil Dagover, Hans Stüwe and Alexander Murski.

The film's sets were designed by Botho Hoefer and Hans Minzloff.

Cast
 Lil Dagover as Coraly Rekoczi  
 Hans Stüwe as Capt. Arpad Bartok  
 Alexander Murski as Col. Elemer Rekoczi  
 Wilhelm Diegelmann as Kalman Bartok  
 Daisy D'Ora as Ilona Bartok  
 Harry Hardt as Lt. Bela Bezeredi  
 Veit Harlan as Zoltan, servant  
 Paul Henckels 
 Margot Zirow
 Trude Berliner 
 Karl Elzer as Major

References

Bibliography
 Parish, Robert. Film Actors Guide. Scarecrow Press, 1977.

External links

1929 films
Films of the Weimar Republic
German silent feature films
Films directed by Victor Janson
1929 drama films
German drama films
Films set in Hungary
German black-and-white films
Silent drama films
1920s German films